Victoire Du Bois (born 14 June 1988/89) is a French actress who made her film debut in Volker Schlöndorff's Calm at Sea (2011). She is best known for playing Jeannie in From the Land of the Moon (2016), Chiara in Call Me by Your Name (2017), and for her leading role as Emma Larsimon on the Netflix show Marianne (2019). She was educated at a lycée in Nantes. Du Bois studied acting at L'Ecole du Jeu and at the Conservatoire National Supérieur d'Art Dramatique (French National Academy of Dramatic Arts).

Filmography

Film

Television

Theatre

References

External links

 
 
 
 

1980s births
Living people
21st-century French actresses
French film actresses
French television actresses
Actors from Nantes
Year of birth uncertain